Cześniki  is a village in the administrative district of Gmina Sitno, within Zamość County, Lublin Voivodeship, in eastern Poland.

The village has a population of 1,460.

See also 
 Battle of Cześniki

References

Villages in Zamość County
Lublin Governorate
Kholm Governorate
Lublin Voivodeship (1919–1939)